The Livorno Hills (also known as Leghorn Hills, or in Italian as the Colline Livornesi) is a hill range in Tuscany, included in the municipalities of Livorno, Collesalvetti and Rosignano Marittimo, and in the Province of Livorno. Due to its vicinity to the sea, the average height is quite low.
Many streams, although the weather is quite dry in the summer, run down from the Leghorn Hills. The longest is known as Rio Ugione, on the border between Livorno and Collesalvetti municipalities.

A natural park called Riserva naturale Calafuria is set in the part of the Livorno Hills near the coast.

References

Mountains of Tuscany
Livorno